Farihibe is a four-part Maldivian short film series written by Ahmed Falah and produced by Mohamed Abdulla under Dhekedheke Ves Productions. The first two installments of the series, directed by Falah were released in 2007 and 2008 respectively. The last two installments of the series were directed by Abdulla Muaz. All the dialogues from Farihibe 4 were conveyed in the form of farihi, a traditional satirical format of a poem.

List of productions

Premise

Farihibe 1
Purposeless, Farihibe (Mohamed Abdulla) sits on a rock in the seashore when his rival Moosafulhu (Ismail Rasheed) appears to bully him. During the heated argument Farihibe catches a glimpse of a pretty young woman, Dhon Aisa (Nadhiya Hassan) and tries his best to hide her from Moosafulhu. However, Moosafulhu sees her for the first time and decides to pursue her love at any cost. This initiates a battle between Farihibe and Moosafulhu to see who can succeed in achieving the love of Dhon Aisa, where the latter starts swinging in both directions.

Farihibe 2
Farihibe falls in love with another woman, Zareefa (Mariyam Azza), an orphan, while she has been the center of attention for Mafuthu Ali (Ismail Rasheed). He hires 
Qadhir (Hamdhan Farooq) to assist him in penning and reciting the most powerful poem, Farihi, to win the heart of Zareefa. Farihibe leads the poem battle and impresses the guardian of Zareefa who advises her to marry him as he seems to be the most eligible candidate to fulfil the will of her dead father. However, in a turn of events, Mafuthu Ali succeeds in finding the jar of silver coins and the poem book as mentioned by the will, which ensured his marriage with Zareefa.

Farihibe 3
Farihibe, a wealthy man who despises women in his life, finally agrees to marry Shaheema (Fathimath Azifa) as requested by his mother, which awakens the devastated Moosafulhu (Ismail Rasheed) with jealousy. Farihibe's first wife, Atheela (Mariyam Rana) warns her to watch out for Farihibe as his father is well-known for his fourteen marriages. A night later to their wedding, Shaheema failed to prepare food for Farihibe citing that the storeroom of the house was locked. This leads Farihibe to divorce her similar to his first marriage. His third wife, Futhoona (Mariyam Azza) follows the same fate and is ultimately approached by Moosafulhu for marriage which she declines. Muhamma's failing arranged marriages hits a success note when he marries the responsible homemaker, Fadheeha (Aishath Rishmy) who meets his requirement of a perfect wife who can run a household.

Farihibe 4
Farihibe is romantically attracted to a young pretty woman, Abidha (Fathimath Azifa) while her vile step-mother (Mariyam Haleem) arranges her marriage with wealthy businessman Ajumal (Ismail Rasheed) who is rumored to be having an affair with Suraiyya (Aishath Rishmy). Farihibe brings up his marriage proposal to Abidha's father who outright rejects him considering his impoverished nature.

Cast

Soundtrack

Accolades

References

Short film series
Maldivian short films